Rimini Protokoll is a German theatre group founded in 2000 by Helgard Haug, Stefan Kaegi, and Daniel Wetzel. They create stage plays, interventions, scenic installations, and radio plays. Many of their works are characterized by interactivity and a playful use of technology.

In 2008, they were awarded the Europe Theatre Prize.

Background
The three met while attending the Institute for Applied Theatre Studies at University of Giessen, Hesse, Germany. They are a team of authors, directors, and designers of sound, stage, and videos, who have been working together since 1999.

They have been invited four times to Berliner Theatertreffen, Germany's most important festival featuring the 10 best performances of Austria, Switzerland, and Germany. Since 2003, their projects also take place within the framework of big national theatres like Vienna's Burgtheater or the Schauspielhaus in Zurich, as well as international festivals.

Method
Rimini Protokoll are often described as the inventors of a new form of documentary theatre, using performers who are not professional actors but rather experts or specialists in their particular spheres of life — professionals of a theatre of the real world. So, instead of presenting actors performing characters as parts of drama texts, they present people whom they find through elaborate research and casting procedures and with whom they develop theatre performances according to their abilities and skills in order to convincingly and strongly present themselves in front of national theatre crowds.

Call Cutta, one of their earlier works, was based on outsourcing: The performers or 'experts', who were employees of a call center, were located in Salt Lake City, Kolkata, India, providing the audience in Berlin with individual cellphone performances, with each call center agent guiding just one spectator solely through the remote maze of lanes of Kreuzberg, Berlin, narrating the story of Subhas Chandra Bose, an Indian revolutionarist freedom fighter.

Awards and recognition
 2008 — Europe Theatre Prize – Europe Prize Theatrical Realities, Thessaloniki

Literature
 Malzacher, Florian and Miriam Dreysse. Experts of the Eyeryday: The Theatre of Rimini Protokoll. Alexander Verlag, Berlin 2008.

References

External links
 
 Rimini Protokoll channel on vimeo.com

German performance artists